Sio Tomkinson (born 27 May 1996) is a New Zealand rugby union player who currently plays as a centre for Dragons RFC in the United Rugby Championship. He has previously played for the Highlanders.

Early career

Hailing from Otago on New Zealand's South Island, Tomkinson was originally schooled at Kavanagh College in Dunedin before switching to Otago Boys' High School in 2011.   He enjoyed a hugely successful time with Otago Boys', winning the Highlanders' first XV competition in each of his seasons with the school as well as scoring a record number of points in a year, more than 450 in 2014.   After leaving school, he began playing for the Harbour Hawks in the local Otago club rugby competition.

Senior career

In April 2022 it was announced that Tomkinson had signed for the Welsh club Dragons RFC in the United Rugby Championship for the 2022/23 season.

Super Rugby

An impressive debut season for the Razorbacks in provincial rugby in 2015 saw him named as a member of the  wider training group ahead of the 2016 Super Rugby season.   The presence of experienced backline players such as Malakai Fekitoa, Matt Faddes and Rob Thompson in the Highlanders set-up meant that Tomkinson had to spend the year kicking his heels on the sidelines, however, in 2017, new Highlanders head-coach, Tony Brown promoted him to the senior squad.

International

Tomkinson represented New Zealand Schools in 2014, scoring a try and being named MVP in their 34-24 win over Australia.   He was also a member of the New Zealand Under-20 side which finished 5th in the 2016 World Rugby Under 20 Championship in England, scoring 2 tries in 5 matches.

References

1996 births
New Zealand rugby union players
New Zealand sportspeople of Samoan descent
Rugby union centres
Rugby union wings
Otago rugby union players
People educated at Otago Boys' High School
People educated at Trinity Catholic College, Dunedin
Living people
Highlanders (rugby union) players
Rugby union players from Dunedin
Dragons RFC players